Daniel Bălan (born 18 September 1979) is a Romanian former football defender, currently manager of Bucovina Rădăuți.

In 2002, he suffered a severe injury, something similar with the one Dutch player Marco van Basten had. After 18 months and multiple surgeries, he returned to the football pitch.

Honours 

Foresta Fălticeni
 Liga II: 1999–00
Steaua București
 Liga I: 2004–05, 2005–06
 Supercupa României: 2001, 2006
FC Vaslui
 Liga II: 2004–05

References

External links 

 
 
 
 
 Daniel Bălan's profile  at SteauaFC.com 

1979 births
Living people
Sportspeople from Suceava
Romanian footballers
Cypriot First Division players
Liga I players
Liga II players
AC Omonia players
FC Steaua București players
Alki Larnaca FC players
Aris Limassol FC players
FC Vaslui players
FC Argeș Pitești players
FC Botoșani players
ACS Foresta Suceava players
Association football defenders
FC SKA-Khabarovsk players
Romanian expatriate footballers
Expatriate footballers in Cyprus
Romanian expatriate sportspeople in Cyprus
Expatriate footballers in Russia
Romanian expatriate sportspeople in Russia